Otis Sistrunk (born September 18, 1946) is a former professional football player who played seven seasons as a defensive lineman, from 1972 to 1978. He played his entire National Football League (NFL) career with the Oakland Raiders. Sistrunk later became a professional wrestler in the National Wrestling Alliance (NWA).

Professional career
Sistrunk was born in Columbus, Georgia, and was one of the few NFL players of his day to not play college football, going directly from William H. Spencer High School in Columbus, Georgia, to the United States Marines. After leaving the military, the 21-year-old found work at a Milwaukee meat-packing plant and played two years of semi-pro football in the area for the West Allis Racers  before joining the Norfolk Neptunes of the Continental Football League in 1969.

Sistrunk played three years for the Neptunes (the last two in the semi-pro Atlantic Coast Football League after the CPFL folded); in 1971, a Los Angeles Rams scout spotted Sistrunk and believed he could play in the NFL. During a team practice, he was observed by representatives of the Oakland Raiders, who brought Sistrunk to their team in 1972.

Otis Sistrunk was inducted into the American Football Association's Semi Pro Football Hall of Fame in 1982

"University of Mars"

During a Monday Night Football telecast, a television camera beamed a sideline shot of the 6'5", 265-pound Sistrunk's steaming bald head to the nation. That, along with the Raiders’ listing of his educational background in the team program as "U.S. Mars” (shorthand for United States Marine Corps), prompted ABC commentator and ex-NFL player Alex Karras to suggest that the extraterrestrial-looking Sistrunk's alma mater was the "University of Mars."

Sistrunk was named to the Pro Bowl in 1974. In 1976, playing under coach John Madden, Sistrunk was part of the Raiders team that won Super Bowl XI against the Minnesota Vikings. He retired after the 1978 season, finishing his career with seven fumbles recovered and three interceptions in 98 games played.

Wrestling career
Sistrunk had a brief wrestling career in the National Wrestling Alliance. Following the breakup of the Fabulous Freebirds, Michael Hayes was in need of a partner and teamed up with Sistrunk. Together, they defeated Jimmy Snuka and Hayes' former tag team partner Terry Gordy to win the NWA Georgia Tag Team Championship on September 27, 1981. Sistrunk soon retired after deciding that he did not enjoy wrestling, however, and the title was vacated in late 1981.

Championships and accomplishments
Georgia Championship Wrestling
NWA Georgia Tag Team Championship (1 time) - with Michael Hayes

Personal life
After leaving football, Sistrunk spent two years as a beer salesman. He was then approached about working with the Army as a civilian employee. He spent twelve years working at Fort Benning, Georgia. Sistrunk now manages Cowan Memorial Stadium at Joint Base Lewis-McChord, Washington and helps with athletic training programs.

He also had a brief movie career, appearing as a short order cook in Car Wash (1976) and in a non-sexual role (as a police officer) in Alex de Renzy's porn film Babyface (1977).

His nephew Caesar Rayford, was a defensive end for the Dallas Cowboys. He is a distant cousin to former NFL player Manny Sistrunk.

References

1946 births
Living people
Players of American football from Columbus, Georgia
American football defensive linemen
American male professional wrestlers
Oakland Raiders players
American Conference Pro Bowl players
Continental Football League players
African-American male professional wrestlers
21st-century African-American people
20th-century African-American sportspeople
20th-century professional wrestlers
NWA National Tag Team Champions